The 1998 Memorial Cup (branded as the 1998 Chrysler Memorial Cup for sponsorship reasons)  occurred May 9–17 at the Spokane Veterans Memorial Arena in Spokane, Washington. It was the 80th annual Memorial Cup competition and determined the major junior ice hockey champion of the Canadian Hockey League (CHL).  Participating teams were the host Spokane Chiefs and the winners of the Ontario Hockey League, Quebec Major Junior Hockey League and Western Hockey League which were the Guelph Storm, Val-d'Or Foreurs and Portland Winter Hawks.  The Winter Hawks won their second Memorial Cup defeating the Storm from a goal in overtime by Bobby Russell. , only Portland (twice) and Spokane (twice) have taken the Cup to the US.

The tournament set a new Memorial Cup attendance record.  However, that record was broken the following year in Ottawa.

Round-robin standings

Scores
Round-robin
May 9 Spokane 5, Val-d'Or 4
May 10 Portland 6, Guelph 2
May 11 Guelph 3, Spokane 1
May 12 Portland 7, Val-d'Or 4
May 13 Guelph 7, Val-d'Or 0
May 14 Portland 4, Spokane 2

Semi-final
May 16 Guelph 2, Spokane 1 (OT)

Final
May 17 Portland 4, Guelph 3 (OT)

Winning roster

Scoring leaders
Andrej Podkonicky, POR, (6g 4a) 10p
Marian Hossa, POR, (5g	4a) 9p
Manny Malhotra, GUE, (1g 6a) 7p
Bobby Russell, POR, (4g 2a) 6p
Mike Hurley, POR, (0g 6a) 6p
Jean-Pierre Dumont, VAL, (3g 2a) 5p
Todd Robinson, POR, (1g 4a) 5p
Greg Leeb, SPO, (3g 1a) 4p
Jason Jackman, GUE, (2g 2a) 4p
Kent McDonnell, GUE, (2g 2a) 4p
Ryan Davis, GUE, (2g 2a) 4p
Perry Johnson, SPO (1g 3a) 4p
Marian Cisar, SPO (0g 4a) 4p
Kevin Haupt, POR, (0g 4a) 4p

Goaltending leaders
Chris Madden, GUE, 2.21 GAA, .947 pct
Brent Belecki, POR, 2.68 GAA, .916 pct
David Haun, SPO, 2.93 GAA, .885 pct
Roberto Luongo, VAL, 6.33 GAA, .857 pct

Award winners
Stafford Smythe Memorial Trophy (MVP): Chris Madden, Guelph
George Parsons Trophy (Sportsmanship): Manny Malhotra, Guelph
Hap Emms Memorial Trophy (Goaltender): Chris Madden, Guelph
Ed Chynoweth Trophy (Top Scorer): Andrej Podkonicky, Portland

All-star team
Goal: Chris Madden, Guelph
Defence: Brad Ference, Spokane; Francis Lessard, Val d'Or
Forward: Andrej Podkonicky, Portland; Manny Malholtra, Guelph; Marian Hossa, Portland

References

External links
 Memorial Cup 
 Canadian Hockey League
Collection of Articles from Canoe.ca
Video of Championship Game

Mem
Mem
Memorial Cup tournaments
Sports in Spokane, Washington
Sports in Portland, Oregon